Hamdard Naunehal is a Pakistani kids bilingual (Urdu and English) monthly magazine. first published by Hakim Said of Hamdard Laboratories, under the editorship of Masood Ahmed Barkati, in 1953.

This magazine is very popular among children due to its emphasis on proper Urdu through the section "نونہال لغت", titbits, moral & mystery stories, cartoons and informative snippets.

The current editor for the magazine is Saleem Farrukhi while the patron is Sadia Rashid (daughter of late Hakim Saeed Shaheed – a philanthropist and founder of Hamdard Industries). The current team took over after death of previous editor Masood Ahmed Barkati. The magazine keeps his memory alive by publishing articles from his times.

This format has not changed for long except the inclusion of a section entitled ھنڈکلیا which aims at teaching basic level cooking, Until in October 2020 when Naunehal was revamped into a bilingual magazine with 96 Urdu and 64 English pages.

See also

 List of Urdu magazines for children
 List of magazines in Pakistan

References

External links
 

1953 establishments in Pakistan
Magazines established in 1953
Monthly magazines published in Pakistan
Children's magazines published in Pakistan
Urdu-language magazines
English-language magazines published in Pakistan